The Ladies Delight Light is a small lighthouse on Lake Cobbosseecontee, in Winthrop, Maine, United States. It was constructed in 1908 and is believed to be the only active inland waters lighthouse in Maine. It operates every night of the year. At the time of its construction, it was the only inland lake lighthouse east of the Mississippi River. It was listed on the National Register of Historic Places in 1984.

History
The lighthouse was designed by Frank Morse, a Boston marine architect.  The small island on which it was constructed, Ladies Delight, is formed by the central part of a large reef; the lighthouse was built to keep a passenger launch at the south end of the lake from running aground in the area.  The Cobbosseecontee Yacht Club erected the tower with the help of two oxen.  Due to the size of their barge, they could only transport one at a time.  They took the first one to the island, and then returned to shore for the second.  In the interval the first ox grew lonely, and began swimming back to the mainland as the workers returned with its partner.  Finally, both oxen were successfully transported, and the lighthouse was built over the course of the summer.

Members of the Cobbosseecontee Yacht Club (aka Cobbosseecontee Lake Association) have always maintained the lighthouse.  Originally its light was provided by kerosene lanterns; a volunteer keeper went out each evening to trim the wicks, clean the globes, and light the beacon.  A reflector in the light was rotated by a system of weights from a longcase clock.  A wind-powered generator powered the light for a while in the 1930s; until 2017, power was provided by cable from Manchester. In November of 2017, the solar powered marine-grade LED beacon was installed. The lantern has been blown off the tower twice; sometime in the 1990s the original iron one was replaced by one made of wood.  Later (2005) a new aluminum top was constructed and installed.  At one time there was an osprey nest on the top of the tower.

Located in the North Bay of Cobbosseecontee Lake, the lighthouse was placed on the National Register of Historic Places in 1984.  In 2001 it had a severe list corrected and in 2005 a new top constructed of marine grade aluminum was installed. The structure was formally dedicated on July 16, 2005 in a ceremony conducted by retiring CYC Commodore, Hugh Stephens.

On August 9, 2008 a 100th anniversary celebration was held at the lighthouse followed by an anniversary party at the nearby home of a former commodore.

See also
National Register of Historic Places listings in Kennebec County, Maine

Further reading

Caldwell, Bill. (1986) Lighthouses of Maine (Portland, ME: Gannett Books).
Clifford, J. Candace, and Clifford, Mary Louise, (2005) Maine Lighthouses: Documentation of Their Past (Alexandria, VA: Cypress Communications).  ; 
 Crompton, Samuel Willard  & Michael J. Rhein, The Ultimate Book of Lighthouses (2002) ; .
 Great Lakes Light Keepers Association, List of Resources.
 Jones, Ray & Bruce Roberts, American Lighthouses (Globe Pequot, September 1, 1998, 1st Ed.) ; .
 Jones, Ray,The Lighthouse Encyclopedia, The Definitive Reference (Globe Pequot, January 1, 2004, 1st ed.) ; .
 Noble, Dennis, Lighthouses & Keepers: U. S. Lighthouse Service and Its Legacy (Annapolis: U. S. Naval Institute Press, 1997). ; .
 Putnam, George R., Lighthouses and Lightships of the United States, (Boston: Houghton Mifflin Co., 1933).
 Roberts, Bruce & Jones, Ray, (2006/05/01) Lighthouses of Maine: A Guidebook And Keepsake ;  Paperback Globe Pequot Press, 96 pages.
 United States Coast Guard, Aids to Navigation, (Washington, DC: U. S. Government Printing Office, 1945).
 
 U.S. Coast Guard, Historically Famous Lighthouses (Washington, D.C.: Government Printing Office, 1957).

References

External links

Lighthouses completed in 1908
Lighthouses on the National Register of Historic Places in Maine
Lighthouses in Kennebec County, Maine
National Register of Historic Places in Kennebec County, Maine
Winthrop, Maine
1908 establishments in Maine